Prometey Central Scientific Research Institute Of Structural Materials is a research institute based in Saint Petersburg, Russia.

The Prometey Institute develops and produces advanced alloys and conducts research in metallurgical and welding techniques. Product lines and activities include heavy armor research and development, metallurgical research for shipbuilding, defectoscope quality control measures, titanium-alloy for submarine hull construction, non-magnetic steels and alloys for anti-submarine vessels, high-strength hull steels, advanced propulsion system materials, aluminum alloys and titanium alloys for machinery system applications.

References

External links
 Official website

Research institutes in Russia
Companies based in Saint Petersburg
Federal State Unitary Enterprises of Russia
Ministry of the Shipbuilding Industry (Soviet Union)
Research institutes in the Soviet Union
1936 establishments in the Soviet Union
Research institutes established in 1936